Ansis Alberts Kaupēns (2 November 1895 – 6 May 1927) was a Latvian robber and serial killer; perhaps the most famous Latvian criminal of the interwar period.
Kaupēns was born in 1895 and baptized in Platone Parish. In 1916 he began serving in the Imperial Russian Army, and after that for the Red Army's 9th Latvian Riflemen Regiment (with the rank of sergeant), but in 1919 or 1920, he deserted and returned to live in Latvia. He committed his first robbery on 29 January 1920 and the last on 29 May 1926. During this period, more than 30 robberies and 19 murders were supposedly committed. In the meantime, Kaupēns worked as a paper hanger in Jelgava during the day. He was even able to stop and rob a passenger train (on 27 September 1923 between Viesīte and Daudzeva), but mostly robbed on highways. Arrested on 8 June 1926 and sentenced to death, Kaupēns was executed by hanging on 6 May 1927. He was buried in Svēte Parish.

The life of Kaupēns became the basis of several books and films, such as Andris Grūtups' 2001 book Tiesāšanās kā māksla and the 2011 film Kaupēns, which was based on his crimes.

See also 
 List of serial killers by country
 List of serial killers by number of victims

References 

1895 births
1927 deaths
Deserters
Executed Latvian people
Executed Latvian serial killers
Latvian people convicted of murder
Male serial killers
People executed by hanging
People executed for murder
People from Jelgava Municipality
Outlaws
Robbers